Aceval is a surname. Notable people with the surname include:

Danilo Aceval (born 1975), Paraguayan footballer
Emilio Aceval (1853–1931), Paraguayan president
Miguel Aceval (born 1983), Chilean footballer
Nora Aceval (born 1953), Algerian traditional storyteller and writer